Rona Green may refer to:

 Rona Green (artist), Australian artist
 Rona Randall (born 1911), born Rona Green, British writer